Luke Korem (born 1 November 1982) is an American filmmaker, whose credits include directing and producing the SXSW award-winning documentary Dealt and the Showtime documentary series Action.

Career 
In 2017, Korem directed and produced Dealt, a documentary which features the life and career of Richard Turner - who is renowned as one of the world's greatest card magicians, yet he is completely blind. Dealt premiered at the SXSW Film Festival where it won the audience award for Best Documentary Feature. The film sold to IFC Films / Sundance Selects for distribution and received critical acclaim, accumulating a score of 95% on Rotten Tomatoes. Variety wrote the film is "fascinating and multifaceted", Film Threat said "Director Luke Korem masterfully tells this story", and The Playlist wrote Dealt achieves "a height few films manage to reach."

In 2019, Korem directed and executive produced the four-part docuseries Action for Showtime. The series explores the lives of professional gamblers, bookies, and oddsmakers as they navigate the landmark Supreme Court ruling lifting the ban on sports gambling in America. The series debuted March 24, 2019 on Showtime and received positive critic reviews. Indiewire wrote "Action is a reminder that the margin between success and failure, like so many areas in this country in 2019, is slimmer than a lot of people pretend it is", and the series "shows the agony and ecstasy of the multibillion dollar industry".

References

External links

1982 births
Living people
American documentary film directors
American documentary film producers